William Lok (: 陸漢洋) (born 7 October 1974 in Hong Kong) is a Hong Kong racing driver currently competing in the FIA World Touring Car Championship for Campos Racing.

Racing career
On 20 August 2017, William Lok secured the Drivers’ Championship of the 2017 Asian Le Mans Sprint Cup and became the first Chinese driver to win a regional LMP Sprint Cup title, after winning the Asian Le Mans Sprint Cup title with driving partner Scott Andrews at Malaysia's Sepang International Circuit with one race in hand.

Personal life
William Lok is son of John Lok, the founder of John Lok and Partners Limited. His mother's family founded Saint Honore Cake Shop. He is the cousin of Christine Loh. His mother died in 2004 of ovarian cancer. He is a graduate of Northeastern University with a degree in Finance and Marketing.

Racing record

Complete World Touring Car Championship results
(key) (Races in bold indicate pole position) (Races in italics indicate fastest lap)

Complete TCR International Series results
(key) (Races in bold indicate pole position) (Races in italics indicate fastest lap)

† Driver did not finish the race, but was classified as he completed over 90% of the race distance.

References

External links 
FIA WTCC driver profile

Lamborghini Super Trofeo Asia driver profile

1973 births
Living people
Hong Kong people
Hong Kong racing drivers
World Touring Car Championship drivers
Asian Le Mans Series drivers
Formula Masters China drivers
Campos Racing drivers
Eurasia Motorsport drivers
20th-century Hong Kong people
21st-century Hong Kong people
Graff Racing drivers
Le Mans Cup drivers